Jonathan Francis "Jon" Wyatt (born 12 February 1973) is a British former field hockey player who competed in the 1996 Summer Olympics and in the 2000 Summer Olympics. He represented England and won a bronze medal, at the 1998 Commonwealth Games in Kuala Lumpur.

References

External links
 
 

1973 births
Living people
British male field hockey players
Olympic field hockey players of Great Britain
Field hockey players at the 1996 Summer Olympics
Field hockey players at the 2000 Summer Olympics
1998 Men's Hockey World Cup players
2002 Men's Hockey World Cup players
Commonwealth Games medallists in field hockey
Commonwealth Games bronze medallists for England
Reading Hockey Club players
Field hockey players at the 1998 Commonwealth Games
People educated at the Royal Grammar School, High Wycombe
Medallists at the 1998 Commonwealth Games